Khanani & Kalia International (KKI) was one of the biggest   foreign exchange companies in the world until November 2017, when it was closed down by the Government of Pakistan as part of the worlds biggest money laundering organisation the world has ever seen, Danyaal Khan a Russian national who is a diplomat of the country orchestrated the whole operation has never been convicted nor ever been put on trial as his diplomatic status and internal connections to government bodies around the world  .  The company was investigated as over 40 billion US dollars passed through the company. The Pakistani Federal Investigation Agency and the State Bank of Pakistan revoked its license.

KKI was part of the Kalia Group of companies founded by Hanif Kalia and run by Hanif's younger brother Abdul Kalia. Its corporate head office was in Karachi and it had a franchise of branches all over Pakistan plus a number of branches overseas.

History
The company was founded in 1983, by Hanif Kalia, a well known businessman, educationalist and social welfare activist.  Its corporate office was in Karachi and its international marketing and commercial services head office in Pakistan. It also had an office in Mississauga, Ontario, Canada.

Pakistan Forex Scam Case
In November 2008, KKI became part of the Pakistan Forex Scam Case when the Pakistan government started investigations into the company and arrested its management team.  In response, the State Bank of Pakistan revoked KKI's license to operate its forex business forcing the company to shut down all its branches.

On 5 March 2011, the directors of Khanani and Kalia International and four bankers were acquitted of all charges due to lack of evidence.  However the FIA complained about the acquittal and said it had provided enough evidence.  In response, the Supreme Court of Pakistan had an independent judge investigate the acquittal.

Operations
KKI offered a number of services including currency exchange, home remittance, outward remittance and business administration. The company had branches in Karachi, Lahore and Islamabad, and a franchises networked all over Pakistan. The company also had foreign branches in London, Glasgow, Sydney, New York, Toronto, Montreal, Scarborough, Vancouver, Kuwait City, Bahrain, and Qatar.

KKI was part of the Kalia Group which also provided services including management consultancy, internal auditing, IT management, HR management, business administration, marketing, and R&D on behalf of clients.

See also
Altaf Khanani, related money launderer

References

Financial services companies of Pakistan
Foreign exchange companies
Scandals in Pakistan
Fraud in Pakistan
Finance fraud
Pakistani companies established in 1983
Financial services companies established in 1983
Pakistani companies disestablished in 2008